The Cotton Belt Railroad Depot is a historic railroad station at the junction of Main and 1st Streets in downtown Fordyce, Arkansas.  The single-story brick building was built  by the St. Louis Southwestern Railway, also commonly known as the Cotton Belt Railroad.  The building is predominantly Craftsman in its styling, with extended eaves that have elaborately styled brackets.

The building was listed on the National Register of Historic Places in 1992.

See also
National Register of Historic Places listings in Dallas County, Arkansas

References

Railway stations on the National Register of Historic Places in Arkansas
Railway stations in the United States opened in 1925
Buildings and structures in Fordyce, Arkansas
Historic district contributing properties in Arkansas
National Register of Historic Places in Dallas County, Arkansas
Fordyce
Former railway stations in Arkansas